Hard Rock Stadium is a multi-purpose stadium located in Miami Gardens, Florida. The stadium is the home field for the Miami Dolphins of the National Football League (NFL) and the Miami Hurricanes, the University of Miami's NCAA Division I college football team.

The stadium also has hosted six Super Bowls (XXIII, XXIX, XXXIII, XLI, XLIV, and LIV), the 2010 Pro Bowl, two World Series ( and ), four BCS National Championship Games (2001, 2005, 2009, and 2013), one CFP National Championship (2021), the second round of the 2009 World Baseball Classic, and WrestleMania XXVIII.

In addition, the stadium hosts the Orange Bowl, an annual college football bowl game, and the Miami Open tennis tournament. Since 2022, the grounds of Hard Rock Stadium has also hosted the Miami International Autodrome, a temporary racing circuit used for Formula 1's Miami Grand Prix. In addition, the stadium will host multiple matches during the 2026 FIFA World Cup. From 1993 until 2011, the stadium also was the home field of the Florida Marlins of Major League Baseball (MLB) until their move to LoanDepot Park in 2012.

The facility opened in 1987 as Joe Robbie Stadium and has been known by a number of names since: Pro Player Park, Pro Player Stadium, Dolphins Stadium, Dolphin Stadium, Land Shark Stadium, and Sun Life Stadium. In August 2016, the team sold the naming rights to Hard Rock Cafe Inc. for $250 million over 18 years.

History

Conception and construction

For their first 21 seasons, the Miami Dolphins played at the Orange Bowl. Team founder Joe Robbie explained what led to the decision to build a new stadium: "In 1976, the city of Miami wanted to quadruple our rent. That did it. I began thinking in earnest about building a stadium."  What made the construction of the stadium truly unique was that it was the first multipurpose stadium ever built in the United States that was entirely privately financed.

Robbie also believed it was only a matter of time before a Major League Baseball (MLB) team came to South Florida. At his request, the stadium was built in a rectangular configuration, with a field that was somewhat wider than was normally the case for an NFL stadium. The wide field also made it fairly easy to convert the stadium for soccer. This resulted in a less intimate venue for football compared to other football facilities built around this time, as well as to the Orange Bowl.

At the time it opened in 1987, Joe Robbie Stadium was located in unincorporated Miami-Dade County, and had a Miami address. Specifically it was in the Scott Lake census-designated place. Today, it is located in the city of Miami Gardens, which was incorporated on May 13, 2003.

Miami Dolphins

The first preseason game for the Dolphins was played on August 16, 1987, against the Chicago Bears. The first regular season game was scheduled for September 27, a week 3 game against the New York Giants; this game was canceled and not made up due to the 1987 players strike. The first regular season NFL game played there was a 42–0 Dolphins victory over the Kansas City Chiefs on October 11, 1987. The game was in the middle of the 1987 NFL strike, and was played with replacement players. The first game with union players was on October 25 of that year, a 34–31 overtime loss to the Buffalo Bills. The stadium hosted its first Monday Night Football game on December 7 of that year, a 37–28 Dolphins victory over the New York Jets.

The Dolphins have played eight playoff games at the stadium, including the 1992 AFC Championship Game, which they lost to the Buffalo Bills 29–10. The Dolphins are 5–3 in playoff games held here, losing the most recent one in January 2009 against the Baltimore Ravens. Also of note, the stadium was host of the 2018 Miracle in Miami game against the New England Patriots, where the Dolphins scored on the last play of the game. The team is unbeaten here against the Los Angeles/St. Louis Rams (4–0); they are winless here against the Dallas Cowboys (0–3).

Miami Hurricanes football

Since 2008, the stadium has served as the home field for the Miami Hurricanes college football team, a premier college football program that has won five national championships since 1983. The university signed a 25-year contract to play at Hard Rock Stadium through 2033.

Prior to their move to Hard Rock Stadium, from 1937 until 2008, the Miami Hurricanes played their home games at the Miami Orange Bowl.

Florida Marlins

From 1993 until 2011, the stadium served as the home field to the Florida Marlins of Major League Baseball.

While Joe Robbie Stadium was built primarily for football, it was also designed to easily accommodate baseball and soccer. Dolphins founder Joe Robbie believed it was a foregone conclusion that MLB would come to South Florida, so he wanted the stadium designed to make any necessary renovations for baseball as seamless as possible. In 1990, Wayne Huizenga purchased 50% of Joe Robbie Stadium and became the point man in the drive to bring Major League Baseball to South Florida. That effort was rewarded in July 1991, when the Miami area was awarded an MLB expansion franchise. The new team was named the Florida Marlins, and placed in the National League to begin play in 1993. Proposed 1994 FIFA World Cup matches could not be held at the stadium, as this June–July tournament conflicted directly with Marlins home games; Orlando's Citrus Bowl was used instead. The first Marlins game at Joe Robbie Stadium was played on April 5, 1993, a 6–3 victory over the Los Angeles Dodgers. The Marlins drew over three million people in their inaugural season, and went on to win two World Series titles in 1997 and 2003.

Despite such preparation and pockets of success, the stadium was less than adequate as a baseball venue. Although designed from the ground up to accommodate baseball, it was not a true multi-purpose stadium. Rather, it was a football stadium that could convert into a baseball stadium. There were plenty of reminders of this at Marlins games. The stadium's color scheme matched that of the Dolphins. When the football season overlapped, cleat marks, as well as silhouettes of hashmarks and logos of the Dolphins or Hurricanes, were visible on the baseball diamond. During football games, the infield dirt was visible on the gridiron. The Marlins reduced capacity to 47,662 (later to 35,521), mainly to create a more intimate atmosphere for baseball.  However, capacity would have likely been reduced in any event, since many of the seats in the upper deck were too far from the field to be of any use during the regular season.  Even with the reduced capacity, the sight lines were less than optimal for baseball. Most seats were pointed toward the 50-yard line—where center field was located in the baseball configuration. Lights were not angled for optimum baseball visibility. Players had to walk through football tunnels to get to dugouts that were designed with low ceiling joists. Some of these issues were showcased on national television during the two World Series held there, when capacity was expanded to over 67,000. Most notably, some areas of left and center field were not part of the football playing field, and fans sitting in the left-field upper deck could not see any game action in those areas except on the replay boards.  These issues became even more pronounced over the years, as, by 2004, a wave of baseball-only parks left what had by then been renamed Pro Player Stadium as the only National League park that played host to both an MLB and an NFL team.

Additionally, the stadium was built for games held during the fall/winter football season, not for games in the tropical summers of South Florida, which feature oppressive heat, humidity, frequent rain, and occasional tropical storms. For most of the stadium's run as a baseball venue, it was the hottest stadium in the majors, with temperatures for day games frequently reaching well above . The Marlins played most of their summer home games at night as a result. The lack of refuge from the uncomfortable climate and disruptive rain delays were considered a cause of chronically low attendance after that inaugural season. When the Marlins were not contending, they struggled to attract crowds larger than 5,000, a figure that looked even smaller than that due to the cavernous environment. Some Marlins players later admitted that they "couldn't wait to go on the road" because Sun Life Stadium (as their home had been renamed in 2010) had the "worst [playing] conditions" and least fan energy in the majors during years when the team was not a contender.

Baseball renovations and configurations

After Huizenga bought part of the stadium, it was extensively renovated to accommodate a baseball team at the cost of several million dollars, as part of his successful bid to bring baseball to South Florida. Purists initially feared the result would be similar to Exhibition Stadium in Toronto; when the Toronto Blue Jays played there from 1977 to 1989, they were burdened with seats that were so far from the field (over 800 feet in some cases) that they were not even sold during the regular season. However, Robbie had foreseen Miami would be a likely location for a new or relocated MLB team, and the stadium was designed to make any necessary renovations for baseball as seamless as possible. On January 24, 1994, soon after buying the Dolphins, Huizenga acquired the remaining 50% of the stadium to give him 100% ownership.

Aside from baseball renovations, the stadium underwent some permanent renovations. In April 2006, the stadium unveiled two Daktronics large video boards, the largest in professional sports at the time. A new -long LED ribbon board, again the largest in the world at the time, was also installed. These have since been surpassed in size.

In addition, the upgrades included vastly widened  concourses on the stadium's north and south sides. Bars, lounges and other amenities were also added. The renovation had three phases, with the second and third phases of renovation taking place after the Marlins left the stadium. These remaining phases included adding a canopy to shield fans from the rain, which caused the relocation of the video boards to the corners of the upper deck, as well as narrowing the sidelines by bringing the seats closer to the field, ending its convertibility to baseball. The orange colored seats were also replaced with aqua colored ones.

2015 renovation
The Marlins left for their own stadium, Marlins Park (now LoanDepot Park), which was completed for the 2012 MLB season.

A privately funded $350 million stadium renovation project began in January 2015, after the 2014 Orange Bowl. The project plan allowed the stadium to be used for football games during the 2015 NFL season, and was completed for the 2016 season. Stadium upgrades included video boards in each corner of the stadium, additional suites, and an open-air canopy over the main seating areas. As part of the renovation, the stadium's seating capacity was reduced from 75,000 to 65,000 seats. Personal seat licenses were not used, and a preview center opened at the stadium in February 2015 to help current and prospective season ticket holders select their ticket packages. Luxury packages were used in place of PSL revenue to help finance the stadium. Thirty-two four-seat pods were installed located in the lower bowl at the south 30-yard lines, with an additional 16 pods at the south end zone. The pods feature a living room arrangement, including premium furniture and television screens that show the NFL RedZone channel and NFL programming.

Tennis
In November 2017, the Miami Open tennis tournament announced that it would move from Crandon Park in Key Biscayne to Hard Rock Stadium in 2019. Its organizers had pursued a $50 million refurbishment of the aging facility, including the addition of three permanent stadium courts. However, the family who originally owned the land filed a lawsuit that blocked their construction, as their agreement to donate the site to Miami-Dade County in 1992 contained a stipulation that only one stadium may be built on the site.

To host the tournament, 29 permanent courts (including 11 tournament courts, with one being a 4,993-seat grandstand court) were built on Hard Rock Stadium's south parking lots. The stadium proper serves as center court, using a modified, 13,800-seat configuration with temporary grandstands constructed on the playing surface, placing the court roughly between the two 30-yard lines. The move to Hard Rock Stadium was praised by players and fans because of the ample space the next complex provides.

In January 2020, the stadium opened the SkyView gondola, which runs at the south side of the stadium complex and provides views of the grounds and the Miami skyline.

Seating capacity

Permanent seating
The 65,326 permanent seats for football and soccer configurations break down as follows: for the general  seats with chair back and armrests, there are 27,397 in the lower deck and 34,736 in the upper deck. There are 10,209 of the bigger club  seats with chair back and armrests. In the 193 executive suites with 10, 12, 16, 20, and 24 seats, there are a total of 3,198. There are also 300 accessible seating locations for spectators with disabilities, 150 seats for working press, and 10 radio/TV booths.

The stadium contains 10,209 club seats and 216 suites. When the Marlins played at the stadium, 2,400 of the club seats and 216 suites were available.

Parking
The parking around the stadium takes up , featuring parking for 24,137 cars, 171 buses, 90 RVs, 85 limousines, and one helipad on site.

Notable events

NFL
The stadium has played host to six Super Bowls (XXIII, XXIX, XXXIII, XLI, XLIV, and LIV), and also hosted the 2010 Pro Bowl.

Super Bowl XLI in 2007 at Dolphin Stadium, when the Indianapolis Colts defeated the Chicago Bears 29–17, was marred by heavy rains. An estimated 30% of the lower-level seating was empty during the second half.

In 2010, the NFL threatened to take the stadium out of further consideration for a Super Bowl or Pro Bowl unless significant renovations were made.  One of the upgrades desired was a roof to protect fans from the elements. In 2012, the Dolphins scrapped plans for pitching a $200-million hotel tax proposal that would have included a partial stadium roof.

In 2016, an open-air canopy was constructed that protects the seating bowl from the elements. The canopy, however, does have a football-field-sized hole in the middle, and thus does not protect the playing field itself from rain. The renovations were completed by the first Miami Dolphins pre-season home game in September 2016.

Previously, since the field runs east–west (rather than north–south, as is the case in most other stadiums), the north stands were exposed to the full force of South Florida's oppressive heat early in the season. The issue became so problematic that Stephen Ross, who owned the Dolphins and the stadium, successfully petitioned the NFL to have all September home games start at or after 4 pm. Ross knew that for much of September, the Dolphins had a substantial home-field advantage against opponents unaccustomed to the sweltering heat. However, he was willing to give that up in order to ensure a more comfortable environment for fans, as well as allow the stadium to host another Super Bowl.

In 2021, the team opened the Baptist Health Training Complex at the west side of the Stadium complex. The Dolphins permanently moved to the state-of-the art facility that hosts the team headquarters, and is also a World Cup practice facility site.

College football

Since 2008, the stadium has served as the home field for the Miami Hurricanes, one of college football's most storied football programs. It also served briefly as the home field for the Florida Atlantic Owls from 2001 to 2002.

The stadium has hosted both the 2009 BCS National Championship Game and the 2013 BCS National Championship Game. The 2013 game between Alabama and Notre Dame set a new attendance record for the facility, with 80,120 on hand to witness Alabama's third BCS Championship in four seasons.

Between 1990 and 2000, the stadium hosted a bowl game variously known as the Blockbuster Bowl, CarQuest Bowl and MicronPC Bowl. After 2000, that bowl was moved to Orlando, where it eventually became known as the Russell Athletic Bowl.

The stadium has been the site of the Orange Bowl game since 1996, except for the January 1999 contest between Florida and Syracuse, which had to be moved due to a conflict with a Dolphins playoff game.

Until 2008, the stadium was host (in even numbered years) to the annual Shula Bowl, a game played between the Florida Atlantic University Owls and the Florida International University Panthers, when the game was hosted by FAU as the home team (FIU hosts the game at its own stadium, Riccardo Silva Stadium, every other year). In 2010, the game was moved to Fort Lauderdale's Lockhart Stadium, and in 2011 the Owls opened FAU Stadium on its Boca Raton campus, and started hosting the Shula Bowl there biennially in 2012.

The stadium hosted the 2021 College Football Playoff National Championship game and (as the Orange Bowl) the 2022 College Football Playoff National Championship semi-final game. The stadium will host the 2026 College Football Playoff National Championship on January 19, 2026.

WrestleMania XXVIII

On April 1, 2012, the stadium hosted WrestleMania XXVIII, WWE's flagship professional wrestling event. This was the second edition of WrestleMania to be held in Florida, and the third to be held entirely outdoors. With an attendance of 78,363, the event grossed $67 million, and was estimated to have generated $103 million in revenue for Miami.

Baseball
Two National League Division Series have been played at the stadium:

 1997 against the San Francisco Giants: Marlins win 3 games to 0
 2003 against the San Francisco Giants: Marlins win 3 games to 1

Two National League Championship Series have been played at Hard Rock Stadium:
 1997 against the Atlanta Braves: Marlins win 4 games to 2
 2003 against the Chicago Cubs: Marlins win 4 games to 3

Two World Series have been played at Hard Rock Stadium:
 1997 against the Cleveland Indians: Marlins win 4 games to 3
 2003 against the New York Yankees: Marlins win 4 games to 2

All those series have been played when the stadium went by the name Pro Player Stadium.

When the Marlins began play in 1993, the stadium's baseball capacity was initially reduced to 47,662, with most of the upper level covered with a tarp. In addition to Huizenga's desire to create a more intimate atmosphere for baseball, most of the seats in the upper level would have been too far from the field to be of any use during the regular season. The stadium's baseball capacity was further reduced over the years, and finally settled at 38,560 seats. However, the Marlins would usually open the entire upper level for the postseason. In the 1997 World Series, the Marlins played before crowds of over 67,000 fans, some of the highest postseason attendance figures in MLB history, only exceeded by Cleveland Stadium during the 1948 and 1954 World Series, old Yankee Stadium prior to its mid-1970s renovation, and the Los Angeles Memorial Coliseum, the temporary home of the Los Angeles Dodgers, in the 1959 World Series.

Although it was designed from the ground up to accommodate baseball, it was never a true multipurpose stadium. Rather, it was built as a football stadium that could convert into a baseball stadium. Most of the seats in the baseball configuration were pointed toward center field – where the 50-yard line would have been in the football configuration. As a result, even with the reduced capacity, the sight lines for baseball left much to be desired. This was particularly evident during the Marlins' World Series appearances in 1997 and 2003. Some portions of left and center field were not part of the football playing field, and fans sitting in the left field upper-deck seats were unable to see these areas except on the replay boards. Even with the reduced capacity, during years the Marlins were not contending, they often drew crowds of 5,000 or fewer—a total that looked even smaller due to the spacious environment.

The stadium was notorious for its poor playing conditions. The lights were not located in optimal positions for baseball visibility. During August and September, when the Dolphins (and later the Hurricanes) shared the stadium, the field conditions were among the worst in the majors, according to both Marlins players and visiting players. Indeed, several Marlins players said that at times, they "couldn't wait to go on the road." Visiting teams hated coming to the stadium as well. For instance, when the Atlanta Braves came to the stadium for the last time in 2011, Dan Uggla, who played for the Marlins from 2006 to 2010, said that he was probably the only Braves player that would miss it.  The stadium's problems as a baseball venue became even more stark as time wore on, as the Marlins' tenure in the stadium coincided with a wave of new, baseball-only parks. When the Marlins began play in 1993, the stadium was one of 14 that hosted both an MLB team and a professional football team. By the time the Marlins left the stadium, however, it was one of only three in the majors (and the only National League stadium) that played host to both a baseball team and an NFL or CFL team, the other two being the Oakland Coliseum and Toronto's Rogers Centre.

For most of the Marlins' tenure at the stadium, it was the hottest stadium in the major leagues. The Marlins played nearly all of their home games from late May through mid-September at night due to South Florida's often oppressive heat and humidity. They also got waivers from MLB and ESPN to play on Sunday nights.

The stadium was the venue where Mark McGwire hit his NL-record 57th home run to best Hack Wilson's 68-year-old record of 56 in 1998. Ken Griffey Jr. hit his 600th career home run off Mark Hendrickson of the Marlins on June 9, 2008; and where Roy Halladay of the Philadelphia Phillies pitched the 20th perfect game in Major League Baseball history on May 29, 2010, against the Marlins.

Concerts

Soccer

A number of soccer matches have been held at the stadium, including a number of international friendlies featuring Central or South American sides. This is due to South Florida being home to one of the largest populations of Central and South Americans in the United States.

The stadium hosted a match between FC Barcelona and C.D. Guadalajara on August 3, 2011, as part of the 2011 World Football Challenge. Guadalajara won the match 4–1 in front of 70,080 attendees.

Colombia beat Mexico 2–0 in a friendly international in front of 51,615 spectators at the stadium on February 29, 2012. A year later, they beat Guatemala 4–1.

A.C. Milan and Chelsea faced each other at the stadium on July 28, 2012. A.C. Milan won the match 1–0 in front of 57,748 fans.

Brazil beat Honduras 5–0 in a friendly match in front of 71,124 spectators on November 16, 2013. The attendance was the highest for a soccer match at the stadium.

England played Ecuador and Honduras at the New Miami Stadium on June 4 and 7, 2014, respectively.

South Korea played against Ghana on June 9, 2014.

On September 5, 2014, two months after a heavy defeat to Germany in the World Cup, Brazil beat Colombia 1–0 in front of an announced attendance of 73,429 fans, a new attendance record for a soccer match at the stadium.

The 2014 International Champions Cup preseason final was held at New Miami Stadium on August 4, 2014, with Manchester United defeating rival Liverpool 3–1 to claim the tournament's second title.

Two 2017 International Champions Cup preseason matches were played at the stadium, one of them being the El Clásico between Barcelona and Real Madrid. Barcelona won 3–2 in the second El Clásico to take place outside of Spain. 66,014 people, above current capacity, attended the match.

On March 23, 2018, the international friendly Peru–Croatia was played at the stadium, which Peru won 2–0.

2026 FIFA World Cup

The stadium will host several matches during the 2026 FIFA World Cup.

Monster Jam
The monster truck touring series Monster Jam used to take place at the stadium every year. The last show performed there was in 2015, and  the shows moved to Marlins Park (now LoanDepot Park) in 2018.

Boxing 
On February 27, 2021, four-division boxing world champion Canelo Álvarez beat Avni Yildirim at Hard Rock Stadium to defend his WBA (Super), WBC and The Ring super-middleweight titles.

On June 6, 2021, the stadium hosted the boxing event Bragging Rights between Floyd Mayweather Jr. and YouTube personality Logan Paul.

On June 12, 2021, the stadium hosted the Social Gloves boxing event YouTubers vs. TikTokers, with Austin McBroom and Bryce Hall headlining the event.

Other events
Other events held at the stadium have included international soccer games, Hoop-It-Up Basketball, RV and boat shows, the UniverSoul Circus, numerous trade shows, and religious gatherings. The stadium has also hosted Australian rules football exhibition matches (including two Victorian Football League (VFL) post-season exhibitions). For the 1988 exhibition between Collingwood and Geelong, the game was played on the diagonal to compensate for the stadium not being an oval.

In 2006, it hosted the High School State Football Championships, sanctioned by the Florida High School Athletic Association (FHSAA).

In 2020, during the COVID-19 pandemic, the stadium began temporarily hosting an outdoor movie theater at the tennis campus and a drive-in theater in the stadium itself. Additionally, the East Lot of the venue has been used as a COVID-19 testing site, drawing hundreds of cars every day at the peak of the pandemic.

On April 18, 2021, Formula 1 announced a 10-year deal to host races in the area around the stadium.

Since 2018, the stadium has hosted the large hip-hop music festival Rolling Loud. The festival will be held for its fourth consecutive year at the stadium from July 22 to July 24, 2022, and will feature headliners including Ye, Future, and Kendrick Lamar.

In film
Films have also been shot at the stadium, most notably Ace Ventura: Pet Detective, which starred Jim Carrey and featured Dolphins great Dan Marino as himself; Marley and Me, starring Owen Wilson and Jennifer Aniston; and the Oliver Stone-directed Any Given Sunday, starring Al Pacino.

Naming rights

The stadium has gone through many name changes, bringing up a question of the value of corporate naming rights.

During the planning and building phase of the stadium, the stadium was referred to as Dolphin Stadium. Joe Robbie, the original and then-owner of the Miami Dolphins and the new stadium, did not want the stadium named after himself. Robbie said "I didn't want them to name it after me. But they insisted, and I guess I'm only human." The stadium opened on August 16, 1987, as Joe Robbie Stadium.

In the early 1990s, Wayne Huizenga gained control of the stadium. Huizenga first sold the naming rights to Pro Player, the sports apparel division of Fruit of the Loom, and the stadium became Pro Player Park on August 26, 1996. After the Dolphins opened the 1996 season there, the stadium was renamed Pro Player Stadium before the team returned home in week 3. The Marlins' 1996 season was played when the stadium was known under three different names, having started the year under the Joe Robbie name.

Fruit of the Loom filed for Chapter 11 bankruptcy protection in 1999, and the Pro Player brand was ultimately liquidated in 2001, but the stadium name held for several more years. In January 2005, the stadium was renamed Dolphins Stadium, coinciding with a renovation of the stadium. In April 2006, it was renamed Dolphin Stadium in an update of graphics and logos.

From February 2008 to January 2009, Stephen M. Ross gradually acquired 95% of the stadium and surrounding land. He then partnered with Jimmy Buffett to change the name once more, this time to Land Shark Stadium after a beer brewed for Buffett's Margaritaville restaurant chain. The renaming was announced on May 8, 2009, but would last less than a year as the deal did not include rights for the upcoming 2010 Pro Bowl and Super Bowl XLIV.

On January 20, 2010, Canadian financial services company Sun Life Financial announced that it had acquired the naming rights. Sun Life Financial announced in 2012, that it will be exiting the U.S. annuity business and focusing on its employee benefits business in the U.S. On August 14, 2015, the Dolphins told the Miami Herald that Sun Life's deal would expire in January 2016, and that the team had no plans to renew, wanting to position its renovated stadium as a brand new entity. The team also stated that it would remove Sun Life's signage upon expiration of the deal, regardless of its ability to find a replacement sponsor before then. During renovations, the stadium was known as New Miami Stadium.

On August 17, 2016, the Dolphins announced that the naming rights had been sold to Hard Rock Cafe International, and that the stadium would be renamed Hard Rock Stadium. The new name was notably ridiculed by fans of the Florida State Seminoles, as the Seminole Tribe of Florida are the owners of the Hard Rock Cafe chain, but the stadium is the host of their rivals, the University of Miami Hurricanes.

See also

 List of NCAA Division I FBS football stadiums

References

External links

Hard Rock Stadium at StadiumDB.com
Hard Rock Stadium – Hurricanesports.com 
Hard Rock Stadium Seating Charts

1987 establishments in Florida
American football venues in Florida
Baseball venues in Florida
CONCACAF Gold Cup stadiums
2026 FIFA World Cup Stadiums
Defunct baseball venues in the United States
Defunct Major League Baseball venues
Defunct college baseball venues in the United States
Hard Rock Cafe
Miami Dolphins stadiums
Miami Hurricanes football venues
Miami Marlins stadiums
Multi-purpose stadiums in the United States
National Football League venues
NCAA bowl game venues
Orange Bowl
Soccer venues in Florida
Sports in Miami Gardens, Florida
Sports venues completed in 1987
Sports venues in Miami-Dade County, Florida
Tourist attractions in Miami-Dade County, Florida
Populous (company) buildings
World Baseball Classic venues